"You'll Come 'Round" is a single released by the British Rock band Status Quo in 2004. It was included on the album XS All Areas – The Greatest Hits.

Track listing 
 "You'll Come Round" (Single Edit) (Rossi/Young) 3.21
 "Lucinda" 3:11
 "Down Down" (Live at the Montreux Jazz Festival 04/07/04) 5:49

Charts

References 

Status Quo (band) songs
2004 singles
Songs written by Bob Young (musician)
Songs written by Francis Rossi
2004 songs
Universal Music Group singles